In mathematics, Hadamard's gamma function, named after Jacques Hadamard, is an extension of the factorial function, different from the classical gamma function. This function, with its argument shifted down by 1, interpolates the factorial and extends it to real and complex numbers in a different way than Euler's gamma function. It is defined as:

where  denotes the classical gamma function. If  is a positive integer, then:

Properties 
Unlike the classical gamma function, Hadamard's gamma function  is an entire function, i.e. it has no poles in its domain. It satisfies the functional equation

Representations 
Hadamard's gamma can also be expressed as

and as

where  denotes the digamma function.

References
 

Gamma and related functions
Analytic functions
Special functions